Lichtenburg was a Nazi concentration camp, housed in a Renaissance castle in Prettin, near Wittenberg in the Province of Saxony.  Along with Sachsenburg, it was among the first to be built by the Nazis, and was operated by the SS from 1933 to 1939.  It held as many as 2000 male prisoners from 1933 to 1937 and from 1937 to 1939 held female prisoners. It was closed in May 1939, when the Ravensbrück concentration camp for women was opened, which replaced Lichtenburg as the main camp for female prisoners.

Operation
Details about the operation of Lichtenburg, held by the International Tracing Service, only became available to researchers in late 2006. An account of the way the camp was run may be read in Lina Haag's book A Handful of Dust or How Long the Night. Haag was perhaps the best known survivor of Lichtenburg, having obtained release before it was shut down.

Lichtenburg was among the first concentration camps in Nazi Germany operating from 13 June 1933; it became a kind of model for numerous subsequent establishments. Soon overcrowded, the detention conditions became increasingly aggravated. Most of the inmates were political prisoners, and so-called habitual offenders (Gewohnheitsverbrecher). From 1937 on it became a camp only for women. In 1939 the SS transferred 900 Lichtenburg prisoners to Ravensbrück, which were its first female prisoners.

The castle today houses a regional museum and exhibit about Lichtenburg's use during the Nazi period.

Personnel

Camp commandant 
 May 1934 – July 1934: SS-Brigadeführer Theodor Eicke
 July 1934 – March 1935: SS-Obersturmbannführer Bernhard Schmidt
 March 1935 – March 1936: SS-Standartenführer Otto Reich
 April 1936 – October 1936: SS-Standartenführer Hermann Baranowski
 November 1936 – July 1937: SS-Standartenführer Hans Helwig
 July 1937 – December 1937: Commisar Alexander Piorkowski

Protective custody chief 
 July 1934 – February 1935: Edgar Entsberger
 February 1935 – April 1935 Karl Otto Koch
 April 1935 – October 1936 Heinrich Remmert
 November 1936 – August 1937 Egon Zill

Director of women's camp 
 December 1937 – May 1939 Günther Tamaschke

Deputy director of camp 
 December 1937 – August 1938 Alexander Piorkowski
 September 1938 – May 1939 Max Koegel

Notable inmates
 Olga Benario-Prestes, German-Brasilian resistance fighter
 Armin T. Wegner
 Walter Czollek
 Arthur Dietzsch
 Friedrich Ebert junior, Politician, son of Friedrich Ebert
 Philipp Fries
 Paul Frölich
 Ernst Grube
 Lina Haag, 
 Lotti Huber, actress
 Erich Knauf
 Wolfgang Langhoff, actor
 Hans Litten, lawyer
 Wilhelm Leuschner, unionist
 Hans Lorbeer, author
 Karl Mache
 Charles Regnier, actor
 Ernst Reuter, Social Democrat
 Kurt von Ruffin, actor
 Gotthard Sachsenberg, 
 Werner Scholem, Communist politician
 Fritz Thurm (1883–1937), Social Democrat
 Lisa Ullrich, Communist politician
 Ilse Unterdörfer missionary

See also 
 Persecution of Jehovah's Witnesses in Nazi Germany

References

External links

Lichtenburg page

Visit to the camp by SS officer Theodor Eicke (image)

Further reading
Sarah Helm: Ravensbruck: Life and Death in Hitler's Concentration camp For Women. 2015 Penguin Random House, pps 4, 17-19, Prisoners sent from Lichtenberg to Ravensbruck 6-21.
Stefan Hördler: Before the Holocaust: Concentration Camp Lichtenburg and the Evolution of the Nazi Camp System. Holocaust and Genocide Studies 25, no. 1 (Spring 2011): 100–126.
Nikolaus Wachsmann: KL: A History of the Nazi Concentration Camps. 2015 Farrar, Straus and Giroux.

 
Subcamps of Buchenwald
Buildings and structures in Saxony-Anhalt
Museums in Saxony-Anhalt
World War II museums in Germany